France Huser is a French novelist and art critic who lives and works in Paris.

Biography 
France Huser was an art critic at the Nouvel Observateur for many years. Her first novel, La maison du désir, "the book of feelings", won her critical and popular success. She is the author of eleven novels including Aurélia, La colline rouge, and Le murmure des sables published by Editions du Seuil, and La fille à lèvre d'orange, La triche and La peau seulement published by Gallimard. France Huser was awarded the Amerigo Vespucci prize in 2004 for her novel 'Le murmure des sables.

 Novels 
1982: La maison du désir, Paris, Éditions du Seuil,  
1984: Aurélia, Le Seuil,  
1986: La chambre ouverte, Le Seuil,  
1988: Les lèvres nues, Le Seuil,  
1992: La colline rouge, Le Seuil,  
1993: Charlotte Corday ou l'Ange de la colère, Paris, Éditions Robert Laffont,  
1999: Les rescapés du Titanic, Bernard Géniès, France Huser, Fayard, 
2004: Le murmure des sables, Le Seuil,  
2006: La fille à lèvre d'orange, Paris, Éditions Gallimard, 144 pages 
2010: La triche, Gallimard, 176 pages 
2011: La peau seulement, Gallimard

References

 External links 
 France Huser on Babelio
 "La Triche", de France Huser : défense et illustration de la duplicité on Le Monde'' (22 September 2010)

20th-century French non-fiction writers
21st-century French non-fiction writers
French women novelists
French art critics
Writers from Paris
Living people
20th-century French women writers
21st-century French women writers
Year of birth missing (living people)